The International Institute (Spanish: Instituto Internacional) is a building located in Madrid, Spain. It was declared Bien de Interés Cultural in 1982.

Building was projected in 1906 by architect Joaquín Saldaña López and built between 1906 and 1911. Until 2002 it housed a school.

References

External links

 Instituto Internacional records at Mount Holyoke College

 Instituto Internacional de Madrid

Buildings and structures in Almagro neighborhood, Madrid
Bien de Interés Cultural landmarks in Madrid